Kuppam Revenue Division is an administrative division in the Chittoor district of the Indian state of Andhra Pradesh. It is one of the 4 Revenue Divisions in the district with 4 mandals under its administration with headquarters at Kuppam.

Revenue Divisional Officer :- T. Sivaiah

Administration 
The 4 mandals in the division are  Kuppam Mandal, Santhipuram mandal, Gudupalle mandal and Ramakuppam mandal.

See also 
List of revenue divisions in Andhra Pradesh
List of mandals in Andhra Pradesh
Chittoor district
Chittoor revenue division
Palamaner Revenue Division
Nagari Revenue Division

References

Revenue divisions in Andhra Pradesh
2022 establishments in Andhra Pradesh
Chittoor district